James Snedden (September 19, 1849June 14, 1919 (?)) was born in Edinburgh, Scotland, and emigrated to the United States at an unknown date.

On February 23, 1864, during the Civil War, he was mustered in the Union Army at Johnstown, Pennsylvania with the rank of Private, in Company E, 54th Pennsylvania Volunteer Infantry. He became a Musician, a non-combatant role, in that unit, rising to the rank of Principal Musician. On June 5, 1864, the Union and Confederate armies met at Piedmont, Virginia. Colonel Jacob M. Campbell, commander of the 54th, ordered Snedden to take his musicians to the rear. Having done so, he took a rifle from a wounded comrade, went to the front, joined in the fighting, and captured Colonel Beuhring Jones, commander of the  60th Virginia Infantry . On May 31, 1865, after the end of the War, he was honorably mustered out of the Army.

He subsequently worked for the Union Pacific Railroad and the Fort Scott and Gulf Railroad, and later became a mine owner and operator.

On September 11, 1897, thirty-three years after Piedmont, he was presented with the Medal of Honor. His citation reads:

He died June 14, 1919 and is buried in the Odd Fellow Cemetery (PM) Lexington, MS.

Notes

References

External links

1839 births
1919 deaths
Military personnel from Edinburgh
British people of the American Civil War
People of Pennsylvania in the American Civil War
Union Army soldiers
American Civil War recipients of the Medal of Honor
United States military musicians
Scottish-born Medal of Honor recipients